Richard Davies is an Australian actor best known for his roles in television series, such as Offspring and The Saddle Club.

Early life
In 2005, Richard graduated from the National Theatre Drama School. In his graduation productions he performed Wayne Shute in The Rivers of China, directed by Ken Boucher and Harry Bagley, and Cathy in Cloud 9, directed by Melanie Beddie.

Acting career
His first television roles were as guests in Neighbours and Satisfaction. After this, he played Max Regnary #2 on The Saddle Club Series 3 from September 2008 – April 2009. Also in 2009, he guest-starred on an episode of the second series of Rush and starred in the film Oxygen.

Since 2008, he has had a recurring role in Bed of Roses. In 2010, he played the lead in the short film When the Wind Changes, which he also wrote and produced. He starred in Offspring. from 2010 to 2017.

Filmography

References

External links

Australian male film actors
Australian male television actors
Living people
21st-century Australian male actors
Year of birth missing (living people)